The Pucciniastraceae are a family of rust fungi in the order Pucciniales. The family contains 11 genera and 158 species.

Genera
Allodus
Calyptospora
Hyalopsora
Melampsorella
Melampsoridium
Milesia
Milesina
Naohidemyces
Peridiopsora
Pucciniastrum
Thekopsora
Uredinopsis

References

External links

Pucciniales
Basidiomycota families